Ampanavoana is a rural municipality in northern Madagascar. It belongs to the district of Antalaha, which is a part of Sava Region. The municipality has a populations of 13,009 inhabitants (2019).

Population
The population is young. 51,37% have 15 years or less, 45.79% between 15 and 60 years and 2,84% of an age of more than 60 years.

Rivers
Four rivers cross the municipality: Anjanazana river, Ampanavoana river, Ampanio and Fampotakely.

Agriculture
The agriculture is mainly substancial: rice, manioc, banana, sugar cane and coco nuts. Next to it also vanilla, cloves and coffee is planted.

Tourism
It is situated at the border of the Masoala National Park.

References 

Populated places in Sava Region